Maud Sellers (1861–1939) was a British historian and museum curator.

Biography
Sellers studied at Newnham College, Cambridge before gaining her PhD from Trinity College, Dublin in 1907. Sellers was interested in the history of the Merchant Adventurers' Hall in York, which she had first visited in 1895 and became involved in the restoration of the hall and the study of the Company of Merchant Adventurers. In 1913 Sellers was made a Member of that Company and was its first woman member in over 400 years. She became the Company's honorary archivist in 1918 and worked as the curator of the guild hall.

Publications
Sellers, M. 1897. "York in the Sixteenth and Seventeenth Centuries", English Historical Review 12, 437-447.
Sellers, M. 1908. The Acts and Ordinances of the Eastfield Company. London, Royal Historical Society.
Sellers, M. 1912. York Memorandum Book part 1 (1376–1419) lettered A–Y in the Guildhall muniment room. Surtees Society.
Sellers, M. (ed.) 1918. The York Mercers and Merchant Adventurers 1356–1917. Durham.
Sellers, M. 1921. A Short Account of the Company of Adventurers of York.

References

1861 births
1939 deaths
People from Harrogate
British women curators
British archivists
Alumni of Newnham College, Cambridge
Alumni of Trinity College Dublin
Contributors to the Victoria County History